Clémentine Poidatz (born 19 June 1981) is a French actress. She studied at the Cours Florent then at the Conservatoire national supérieur d'art dramatique in Paris, France.

Filmography

Cinema 
 2017 : To Each, Her Own by Myriam Aziza : Geraldine
 2016 : Vendeur by Sylvain Desclous : Karole
 2016 : Shut In by Farren Blackburn : Lucy
 2015 : Les soucis by Yacine Badday
 2014 : Les Yeux jaunes des crocodiles by Cécile Telerman : Caroline Vibert
 2013 : Les Yeux Fermés by Jessica Palud : Mina
 2012 : Mains armées by Pierre Jolivet : Nathalie
 2011 : Ailleurs c'est ici by Thomas Creveuil (c.m.)
 2008 : Un sourire malicieux éclaire son visage by Christelle Lheureux : Elle
 2008 Hello Goodbye by Graham Guit : Gladys
 2008 Frontier of the Dawn by Philippe Garrel : Eve
 2007 : Could This Be Love? by Pierre Jolivet : Marina
 2006: Marie Antoinette by Sofia Coppola : the countess of Provence

Television 
 2018 : Mars (season 2) : Amélie Durand (6 episodes)
 2016 : Mars (season 1) : Amélie Durand (6 episodes)
 2015 : The law of Alexandre : Eléonore Vauthier (1 episode)
 2015 : Mars: Amélie Durand
 2014 : Profilage Season 5 :  Elisa (3 episodes)
 2012 : Spin by Frédéric Tellier : Valentine

References

External links 
 

1981 births
Living people
Actresses from Paris
French film actresses
French television actresses
21st-century French actresses